Protectosil is a silane manufactured by Evonik and marketed a protective coating for building surfaces.  It is used as a water repellent, and for corrosion and graffiti control.

References

Brand name materials
Silanes